Acmispon is a genus of flowering plant in the family Fabaceae (legumes), native to North America and the west coast of Chile in South America. It includes several species of American bird's-foot trefoils and deervetches formerly contained in the globally distributed genus Lotus. The former genus Syrmatium is included in Acmispon. The Jepson eFlora accepts only Acmispon.

Species
, the following species were accepted:

Acmispon americanus (Nutt.) Rydb.
Acmispon argophyllus (A.Gray) Brouillet
Acmispon argyraeus (Greene) Brouillet
Acmispon brachycarpus (Benth.) D.D.Sokoloff
Acmispon cytisoides (Benth.) Brouillet, syn. Syrmatium cytisoides
Acmispon decumbens (Benth.) Govaerts, including Acmispon nevadensis (S.Watson) Brouillet
Acmispon dendroideus (Greene) Brouillet, syn. Syrmatium veatchii
Acmispon denticulatus (Drew) D.D.Sokoloff
Acmispon distichus (Greene) Brouillet
Acmispon glaber (Vogel) Brouillet
Acmispon grandiflorus (Benth.) Brouillet
Acmispon haydonii (Orcutt) Brouillet, syn. Syrmatium haydonii 
Acmispon junceus (Benth.) Brouillet, syn. Syrmatium junceum
Acmispon maritimus (Nutt.) D.D.Sokoloff
Acmispon mearnsii (Britton) Brouillet
Acmispon micranthus (Torr. & A.Gray) Brouillet, syn. Syrmatium micranthum
Acmispon nudatus (Greene) Brouillet
Acmispon parviflorus (Benth.) D.D.Sokoloff
Acmispon procumbens (Greene) Brouillet
Acmispon prostratus (Torr. & A.Gray) Brouillet, syn. Syrmatium prostratum
Acmispon rubriflorus (H.Sharsm.) D.D.Sokoloff
Acmispon subpinnatus (Lag.) D.D.Sokoloff
Acmispon tomentosus (Hook. & Arn.) Govaerts, including Acmispon heermannii (Durand & Hilg.) Brouillet
Acmispon wrangelianus (Fisch. & C.A.Mey.) Sokoloff

Other species that have been recognized
Acmispon rigidus (Benth.) Brouillet = Ottleya rigida (Benth.) D.D.Sokoloff
Acmispon strigosus (Nutt.) Brouillet = Ottleya strigosa (Nutt.) D.D.Sokoloff

References

External links
 Jepson Manual Second Edition

 
Fabaceae genera